Mai Kangde (born 5 April 1977) is a Chinese boxer. He competed in the men's bantamweight event at the 2000 Summer Olympics.

References

External links
 

1977 births
Living people
Chinese male boxers
Olympic boxers of China
Boxers at the 2000 Summer Olympics
Place of birth missing (living people)
Boxers at the 1998 Asian Games
Asian Games competitors for China
Bantamweight boxers
21st-century Chinese people